Jagtar Singh Diyalpura is an Indian politician and the MLA representing the Samrala Assembly constituency in the Punjab Legislative Assembly. He is a member of the Aam Aadmi Party.  He was elected as the MLA in the 2022 Punjab Legislative Assembly election.

Career
He has completed matriculation and traded in poultry and mushroom farming.

He entered politics and joined the Aam Aadmi Party. He contested the assembly election for the first time in 2022. He defeated the Sanyukt Samaj Morcha (SSM) president and its chief ministerial candidate Balbir Singh Rajewal and four-time sitting Congress MLA Amrik Singh Dhillon. The Aam Aadmi Party gained a strong 79% majority in the sixteenth Punjab Legislative Assembly by winning 92 out of 117 seats in the 2022 Punjab Legislative Assembly election. MP Bhagwant Mann was sworn in as Chief Minister on 16 March 2022.

Member of Legislative Assembly
Diyalpura was elected as the MLA in the 2022 Punjab Legislative Assembly election.  He represented the Samrala Assembly constituency in the Punjab Legislative Assembly.

Committee assignments of Punjab Legislative Assembly
Member (2022–23) Committee on Estimates 
 Member (2022–23) Committee on Co-operation and its allied activities

Electoral performance

References

External links
  

Living people
Punjab, India MLAs 2022–2027
Aam Aadmi Party politicians from Punjab, India
Year of birth missing (living people)